Rosebery House is a residential project located in Brisbane, Queensland, designed by Andresen O'Gorman Architects in 1998.

The building
The house is situated on a long steep gully surround by subtropical bush land, terminating at the Brisbane River. It consists of three pavilions with interconnecting decks allowing the interior to open to the outside, maximizing access to the northern sunlight and connection to the landscape. Timber batten screens along the western façade add texture to the rectilinear form and act as shading from the summer sun.

References

Buildings and structures in Brisbane